Jane Ngotho Wanjiku (born 29 November 1969) is a former Kenyan long-distance runner who specialised in 3000 metres, and 10,000 metres events. She won three medals in two different editions of the African Championships in 1989 and 1990, including one gold in 10,000 metres at the 1989 African Championships in Athletics in Lagos. She also competed for Kenya in the 1992 Summer Olympics in 3,000 metres, but did not progress to the finals.

Achievements

References

External links

1969 births
Living people
Kenyan female long-distance runners
Olympic athletes of Kenya
Athletes (track and field) at the 1992 Summer Olympics
World Athletics Championships athletes for Kenya
Kenyan female cross country runners
20th-century Kenyan women